Popuri Lalita Kumari, popularly known by her pen name Volga, is Telugu poet and writer well known for her feminist perspective. She was born in Guntur, Andhra Pradesh, India. She won the prestigious Sahitya Akademi Award in 2015 for her short story compilation 'Vimukta Kadha Samputi' in Telugu. Along with being a writer, she has also been a professor and head of scripting division in Tollywood. Her work initiated debates across the country about feminism, in times when the idea was hardly accepted. The Library of Congress has a collection of her most popular published works, including the English translations of selected short stories.

Early life and education 
Volga is born in Guntur on 27, Nov 1950. She completed her MA in Telugu literature from Andhra University in 1972.

Career
Volga after her MA joined as a Telugu professor at VSR & NVR College, Tenali between the period 1973 to 1986. Later, she worked in scripting division as a senior executive at Ushakiran Movies during 1986–1995. She later in 1991 joined Asmita Resource Centre for Women, a Telangana-based NGO which addresses women's issues, as its President and presently serving as the Chairman of the organization. She is also the member of the publication, Vamtinti Masi (Soot from the Kitchen), an editorial of Asimita Organization, which is an active member of Telugu Advisory council for National Book Trust of India.

Author
Volga is known for her feminist literary works. Her novels, articles, poems portray women with modern, progressive ideologies. She while keeping the quality of work maintains the reality of characters, intact. All of her novels were written while she was a full-time employee, rather than fully dedicating her time to the novels. She published her first novel, Sahaja in 1986. The novel was a debatable topic among the newspaper columns. The immediate next year, 1987, her second novel Sveccha was published. These two novels speak how marriage binds a woman and shackles her freedom.

Literary works
Lalita Kumari has penned and translated around 50 publications. The most popular ones are listed below:

Lalita Kumari wrote articles that were published in journals and newspapers, mostly regarding feminism. She became the first person to introduce western feminists, Feminist Movement, First-Wave Feminism and Second Wave Feminism to Telugu readership.

Awards and honors

References

Sources
http://vsrnvr.ac.in/nvr/tel.html
http://www.bhaavana.net/volga/ids/volga.html
http://www.newindianexpress.com/cities/hyderabad/People-Were-Angry-With-my-Writing-Volga/2015/12/19/article3184504.ece1
http://www.newindianexpress.com/cities/hyderabad/Feminist-Volga-Wins-Sahitya-Akademi-Award/2015/12/18/article3183580.ece
https://www.loc.gov/acq/ovop/delhi/salrp/kumari.html

1950 births
Living people
Telugu women writers
Telugu writers
Women writers from Andhra Pradesh
People from Guntur
Poets from Andhra Pradesh
Indian women poets
Indian women novelists
Novelists from Andhra Pradesh
Indian feminist writers
20th-century Indian novelists
20th-century Indian women writers
Indian women dramatists and playwrights
Dramatists and playwrights from Andhra Pradesh
20th-century Indian dramatists and playwrights
Recipients of the Sahitya Akademi Award in Telugu
20th-century pseudonymous writers
Pseudonymous women writers